Car Nicobar is the northernmost of the Nicobar Islands, and one of three local administrative divisions of the Indian district of Nicobar.

Car Nicobar may also refer to:
 Car Nicobar Air Force Base
 Car Nicobar-class patrol vessel
 Car Nicobar common snow flat (Tagiades japetus), a species of spread-winged skipper butterfly
 Car Nicobar Subdivision
 Car Nicobarese, a language spoken in the Nicobar Islands